The Rebild Festival (Danish: Rebildfesten), or Rebild Celebrations, is an annual celebration of the American Independence Day in Denmark. At the same time, it serves as a homecoming for Danish-Americans. It takes place in the Rebild National Park in Jutland from which it takes its name and is arranged by the Danish-American Rebild Society.

It is the largest event celebrating the 4th of July outside USA.

History

Rebild National Park (Danish: Rebild Bakker) is a Danish national park situated near the town of Skørping in Rebild municipality, Region Nordjylland in northern Jutland, Denmark. The idea of arranging an annual gathering for Danish-Americans in a moorland setting in Denmark originated with Danish immigrant Max Henius. Funds were raised by Danish Americans to purchase to 200 acres (0.81 km2) of heather-covered hills and moorland, located within Denmark's largest forest, Rold Forest (Danish: Rold Skov).

When the area for the park was presented to the Danish government, it was specified that the area was to remain in its natural state and be open to the general public throughout the year. Henius also required it to serve as the venue for annual Fourth of July celebrations. Every July 4 since 1912, except during the two world wars and the COVID-19 pandemic, large crowds have gathered in the heather-covered hills of Rebild to celebrate American Independence Day. Due to a period of national mourning caused by King Frederik VIII's sudden death in May 1912, the first Rebild Festival was delayed until August 5. It was attended by somewhere between 10,000 and 15,000 people, including about 1,000 returning emigres to the U.S. Attendance peaked at approximately 50,000 in 1948.

Significant speakers

See also
 Danes Worldwide
 Solvang

References

External links 
 Society history Rebild Society (2011-06-02)
 Rebild National Park Society Homepage in English

Independence Day (United States) festivals
Festivals in Denmark
1912 establishments in Denmark
July events
Recurring events established in 1912
Danish-American history
Summer events in Denmark